ʔaq̓am, also called St. Mary's Indian Band, are a First Nation based in the East Kootenay region of British Columbia.  In the British Columbia Treaty Process They are part of the Ktunaxa Kinbasket Tribal Council.

Chief and councillors
Chief:
 Joe Pierre Jr
Councillors:
 Julie Birdstone
 Codie Morigeau
 Vickie Thomas
 Jason Andrew

Treaty process
There are in Stage 4 of the BC Treaty Process.

History

Demographics
The Lower Kootenay First Nation has 345 members.

Economic development

Social, educational and cultural programs and facilities

See also
 Kootenay Indian Residential School
 ʔaq̓am Community

References

East Kootenay
Ktunaxa governments